Misha Zilberman (born 30 January 1989) is an Israeli badminton player. He competed for Israel at the 2012, 2016, and  2020 Summer Olympics. He also won a bronze medal at the 2022 European Badminton Championships, and represented Israel at the 2015 and 2019 European Games. Zilberman is the first Israeli player to win a medal at the European Badminton Championships.

Early and personal life 
Zilberman was born in Moscow, Soviet Russia. He is an only child of his father, Michael, and his mother, Svetlana Zilberman. His father was born in Russia in 1945, and immigrated to Israel in 1991, with his wife and son Misha, and worked in Pardes Hannah and then in Rishon LeZion. Svetlana was born in Belarus. She began playing badminton at the age of 12, which is how she met Michael, who was her coach.

Both his parents come from athletic backgrounds. His father was a member of the Soviet national floor gymnastics team until he retired as the result of an injury. He then became an assistant coach to the Soviet national team in badminton. Svetlana plays professional badminton. Her greatest accomplishment was winning a bronze medal in the 1986 European Badminton Championships for the USSR.

Zilberman served in the Israel Defense Forces from August 2007 to August 2010. He lives in Ness Ziona, Israel.

Career

Early years
When he was still a baby Zilberman used to join his mother at her badminton practice, and with time he began playing himself. At the age of 12 he began his serious daily training. He began to compete in junior badminton tournaments in 2003. His club is Kfar Maccabiah. He is coached by both his parents, as his mother coaches him, and his father is head coach of Israel's national badminton team.

Zilberman won the senior Israeli Badminton Championship when he was 16 years old, in 2004. In 2006 and 2009 he played mixed doubles with his mother at the Badminton World Championships, as the Championships' first mother-son mixed doubles team.

2010-19
In 2011, Zilberman competed for six months for the Odense badminton club in the professional league in Denmark. In April 2012 he reached the finals of the Tahiti Air Nui International, improving his world ranking by 14 places. In 2012, he won the Israeli Badminton Championship in both singles and mixed doubles (with his mother). In May 2012 he was ranked # 64 internationally.

Zilberman competed for Israel at the 2012 Summer Olympics, the first appearance by an Israeli badminton player in the Olympics. Ranked 33rd in the Olympic rankings in singles, he came in 33rd in the Games.

In July 2013 Zilberman won two gold medals at the 2013 Maccabiah Games, one in singles, one in mixed doubles with his mother. In May 2015, he competed in mixed doubles with his mother, who was 56 years old, at the 2015 Sudirman Cup in Dongguan, China.

Zilberman represented Israel at the 2015 European Games in badminton in men's singles. He lost in the round of 16 to Zvonimir Đurkinjak of Croatia in three sets.

He competed for Israel at the 2016 Summer Olympics in badminton. Zilberman garnered Israel's first-ever win in Olympic badminton, beating Yuhan Tan of Belgium 22-20 and 22-12, but went 1-1 in his group and did not advance to the next round. Misha ranked 26th in the Olympic rankings in singles, and came in 14th at the Olympic Games.

Zilberman won a gold medal at the 2017 Maccabiah Games in singles, and another in mixed doubles with his mother.

2020-present
He competed for Israel at the 2020 Summer Olympics in badminton, in what was his third Olympics. He came in 14th at the Olympic Games, after he defeated world # 15, and 2019 world championship bronze medalist, Sai Praneeth Bhamidipati, but was defeated by Mark Caljouw.

At the 2022 European Badminton Championships, he won a bronze medal as he defeated Luka Ban of Croatia, Kari Gunnarson of Iceland, Mark Caljouw of the Netherlands (ranked # 26 in the world), and 2018 European Championship bronze medalist Brice Leverdez of France in the quarterfinals, before losing to 2020 Olympic champion Viktor Axelsen of Denmark in the semi-finals.

Achievements

European Games 
Men's singles

European Championships 
Men's singles

BWF International Challenge/Series (13 titles, 10 runners-up) 
Men's singles

Mixed doubles

  BWF International Challenge tournament
  BWF International Series tournament

References

External links

 
 
 
 

1989 births
Living people
Russian emigrants to Israel
Badminton players from Moscow
People from Ness Ziona
Israeli male badminton players
Badminton players at the 2012 Summer Olympics
Badminton players at the 2016 Summer Olympics
Olympic badminton players of Israel
Badminton players at the 2015 European Games
Badminton players at the 2019 European Games
European Games bronze medalists for Israel
European Games medalists in badminton
Competitors at the 2013 Maccabiah Games
Competitors at the 2017 Maccabiah Games
Maccabiah Games gold medalists for Israel
Maccabiah Games bronze medalists for Israel
Maccabiah Games medalists in badminton
Badminton players at the 2020 Summer Olympics